The following is a list of the presidents of the University of Pennsylvania, which began operating in 1751 as a secondary school, the Academy of Philadelphia, and added an institution of higher learning in 1755, the College of Philadelphia.

Notes

Pennsylvania
Pennsylvania
Pennsylvania